Goliath grouper can refer to:

Atlantic goliath grouper (Epinephelus itajara), Atlantic Ocean, including the Caribbean
Pacific goliath grouper (Epinephelus quinquefasciatus), East Pacific

See also
 Giant grouper (Epinephelus lanceolatus), Indo-Pacific